Three Emperors may refer to:
 League of the Three Emperors, an alliance between Germany, Russia and Austria-Hungary, from 1873 to 1887.
 Year of the Three Emperors, the year of 1888 where the German Empire had three different emperors.